San Bernardo is a municipality and town of Colombia in the department of Cundinamarca. It is 99 km from Bogotá. It is characterized as an agricultural pantry area due to the high fertility of the land and variety of climates. San Bernardo's main products are blackberry and pea, renowned for its excellent quality.

Due to its location on the Andes the weather conditions are ruled by the altitude and by the wind from the Páramo Sumapaz; this affects the temperature cooling some areas of the municipality, especially at night, and providing mild weather in some other high altitude areas.

History 

San Bernardo was born from a vast amount of mountain terrain colonized to 1910 on July 22 in the morning when Father Mazo celebrated Mass and said the town was founded in honor of Archbishop of Bogotá Bernardo Herrera Restrepo; it was blessed that day. The bells of chapel were donated by General Charles J. Heredia.

In January 1913, the first party enlivened by the band Espinal. The municipality of Pandi in 1914 it stood at corregimiento. By Ordinance No. 66, April 30, 1920 emerged as the municipality, the municipality of Pandi segregated, plus the district of Nazareth, was sentenced by the Governor Eduardo Restrepo Saenz and regulated by Decree 289 of June 23, 1921. The first mayor was Miguel Mena.

The tribunal ruling by June 30 of 1923 declared null and that the ordinance under the Gobernandor Eduardo Briceño by Decree 1254 of August 14, 1923 abolished the town reintegrating Pandi and Bogota. For Ordennaza No. 62, May 3, 1927 was definitely the municipality and the mayor was Malo Daniel O Leary. The parish was established by decree of January 29, 1932 Archbishop Ismael Perdomo.

Tourism 

The great natural landscapes are accompanied by agricultural pictorial scenes, water flows and springs as well. It is recognized for the great variety of native vegetation, flowers and birds.

Mummies 

Increasingly travelers are visiting the natural mummies of San Bernardo housed in a mausoleum in the local cemetery. Hundreds of mummies have been discovered here since the town relocated the cemetery in the mid-1950s after the previous cemetery suffered a flood. It is unclear what is causing bodies buried here to mummify, though many locals say it is because of a diet rich in a local fruit, the chayote, known locally as the guatila. However, because the clothes were also preserved, the cause of mummification is more likely due to the climate and/or the altitude of the town. There are approximately 14 mummies on display in the mausoleum, many preserved almost completely with skin, hair and even the clothes they were buried in. Groundskeepers insist the bodies are not embalmed or treated in any way before being buried. The cause is the micro climate in the tombs, and the fact that the buried bodies wear clothes that protect from fly larvas inside the tombs. The only insects that enter the tombs are from burial flowers, and flies enter on those. The bodies are buried with clothes, which protect the bodies from the larvas, the dry micro climate in the tomb then dries out the bodies. The bodies have arched backs, which is typical of mummies from dry climate, according to forensic specialist in the documentary Udda platser i Världen (2018), season 1, episode 9 of 20.

Events and places 

 Fairs and festivals are held at the end of June and early July; they have great appreciation for quality and organization.
 Principal church
 Historic roads.
 Cemetery
 The mausoleum of the Natural Mummies: Well-preserved mummies are at this place. Although several theories around, the natural mummification in the cemetery is still an enigma.
 Cerro Paquilo
 Natural caves
 Piedra del Sol: rock in the sidewalk "El Carmen" with prehispanic indigenous petroglyphs.
 The Lajas
 Mirador of Portones
 Water Treatment Plant. Floral displays.
 The Market offers the opportunity to find the great variety of fruits and vegetables produced in the region. Sunday is its busiest day.
 The food hall: a set of kiosks that offer typical Colombian food

Outdoor activities 

 Hiking
 Birdwatching

References

External links 
 San Bernardo Principal Page. Spanish

Municipalities of Cundinamarca Department